is a Japanese actress, voice actress and singer from Kumamoto Prefecture. She is affiliated with Ken Production.

Biography

Filmography

Television animation
2006 
Onegai My Melody: Kuru Kuru Shuffle, Megumi Katori
2007
[[Ani*Kuri15|Neko no Shuukai]], Daughter, Chobi
Reborn!: Basil
2008
A Certain Magical Index: Sasha Kreutzev 
Yu-Gi-Oh! 5D's: Luca
2009
Reborn!: Alfin
2011
Inazuma Eleven Go: Tenma Matsukaze
Chihayafuru: Arata Wataya (young)
Lupin the 3rd: Record of Observations of the East - Another Page: Rumi
2012
Hunter × Hunter (2011): Zushi
Smile Precure!: Keita Midorikawa
Natsuiro Kiseki: Koharu Okiyama
2013
Love Lab: Rentarō Kurahashi
Senyu: Febuar Zwei
Gargantia on the Verdurous Planet: Bebel
Pocket Monsters: XY: Corni, Premier, Tony, Satoshi's Yayakoma/Hinoyakoma, Satoshi's Onbat
DokiDoki! Precure: Raquel
2014
Chaika - The Coffin Princess: Toru Acura (young)
Magica Wars: Renka Ariake 
The World Is Still Beautiful: Kara Lemercier 
2015
My Love Story!!: Makoto Sunakawa (young)
Is It Wrong to Try to Pick Up Girls in a Dungeon?: Hephaestus
Mobile Suit Gundam: Iron-Blooded Orphans: Kudelia Aina Bernstein
Kami-sama Minarai: Himitsu no Cocotama: Makoto Yotsuba, Tokumaru
Pocket Monsters: XY&Z: Satoshi's Onbat
2016
Kiznaiver: Chidori Takashiro
Naruto: Shippuden: Itachi Uchiha (young)
Macross Delta: Heinz Nerich Windermere
2017
Inazuma Eleven: Ares: Masakatsu Hiyori
2018
Bloom Into You: Akari Hyūga
Cutie Honey Universe: Junpei Hayami
Inazuma Eleven: Orion no Kokuin: Li Hao
2019
Revisions: Kanae Izumi
2020
Uchitama?! Have you seen my Tama?: Takeshi Okamoto
Pokémon Journeys: Corni
Iwa-Kakeru! Sport Climbing Girls: Kaoru Niijima
Boruto: Naruto Next Generations: Natto Itohiki
2021
Horimiya: Sōta Hori
Shinkansen Henkei Robo Shinkalion Z: Hanabi Ōmagari
Kageki Shojo!!: Akemi Takei
2022
Made in Abyss: The Golden City of the Scorching Sun: Vueko
2023
Skip and Loafer: Mika Egashira
Pokémon: Roy

Theatrical animation
Yu-Gi-Oh!: Bonds Beyond Time (2010): Luca
Planzet (2010): Kaori Sagawa
The Garden of Words (2013): Brother's girlfriend
Hunter × Hunter: The Last Mission (2013): Zushi
Yo-kai Watch: Enma Daiō to Itsutsu no Monogatari da Nyan! (2015): Yuto Arima
Rudolf and Ippaiattena (2016):
My Hero Academia: Heroes Rising (2019): Katsuma Shimano

Video games
Harvest Moon DS: Grand Bazaar (2008): Gretel
Inazuma Eleven GO (2011): Tenma Matsukaze
Granblue Fantasy (2014): Laguna
Hyperdevotion Noire: Goddess Black Heart (2014): Aizen Burossa
Fate/Grand Order (2015): Paris

Dubbing
F4 Thailand: Boys Over Flowers: Gorya Thithara Jundee (Tontawan Tantivejakul)
FBI: Kristen Chazal (Ebonée Noel)
Willow: Jade (Erin Kellyman)

Television drama
Utsukushii Rinjin (2011): Minami

Radio drama
Nissan A, Abe Reiji: Beyond the Average (2006–): Satomi Nansō

Stage
Musical Kuroshitsuji-Chi ni Moeru Licorice- (2014): Meyrin

Discography
Album
Afterglow (2012)

Appearances in other albums

References

External links
  
 Official agency profile 
 
 

1983 births
Living people
Voice actresses from Kumamoto Prefecture
Japanese video game actresses
Japanese voice actresses
Japanese women pop singers
Japanese musical theatre actresses